In celestial mechanics, the eccentricity vector of a Kepler orbit is the dimensionless vector with direction pointing from apoapsis to periapsis and with magnitude equal to the orbit's scalar eccentricity. For Kepler orbits the eccentricity vector is a constant of motion. Its main use is in the analysis of almost circular orbits, as perturbing (non-Keplerian) forces on an actual orbit will cause the osculating eccentricity vector to change continuously as opposed to the eccentricity and argument of periapsis parameters for which eccentricity zero (circular orbit) corresponds to a singularity.

Calculation
The eccentricity vector  is: 

which follows immediately from the vector identity:

where:
 is position vector
 is velocity vector
 is specific angular momentum vector (equal to )

 is standard gravitational parameter

See also
Kepler orbit
Orbit
Eccentricity
Laplace–Runge–Lenz vector

References

Orbits
Vectors (mathematics and physics)